The Takou River (in its upper reaches called the Takou Stream) is a river of the Northland Region of New Zealand's North Island. It flows generally east from its sources east of Kaeo to reach the Pacific Ocean at Takou Bay, 15 kilometres north of Kerikeri.

See also
List of rivers of New Zealand

References

Far North District
Rivers of the Northland Region
Rivers of New Zealand